Panchadasi or Panchadashi (Devanagari: पञ्चदशी IAST paṃcadaśī) is a simple yet comprehensive manual of Advaita Vedanta written in the fourteenth century CE (1386-1391) by Vidyaranya, previously known as Madhavacharya.

Pancha (पञ्च) is five and dasi (दशी) is ten, are the total fifteen chapters divided into three quintets the three aspects of Brahman, Sat (सत्, Truth), Chit (चित्, Consciousness) and Ananda (आनंद, Bliss) aspects of Reality. It elaborates Advaita (non dual), Consciousness, Jiva, Maya, Prakriti (Prakṛti, Nature), Mahat (universal mind), Buddhi (Intellect), Ahamkara (Ego), Avidya (Ignorance), and ananda (Bliss).

Dating 
Panchdasi was written during the later years of Vidyaranya's life around 1386 CE.

About Vidyaranya 

Vidyaranya was born around 1300 CE in South India. Madhava Madhavacharya, Madhavamantri, Madhavamataya were the names which Vidyaranya was known before his turning into recluse.

His father was Mayana (मायण) and Mother Srimati (श्रीमती), two brothers Sayana (सायण), and Bhoganatha (भोगनाथ). He had two Gurus Sarvagyvishnu (सर्वज्ञविष्णु) and Bhartiteerth (भारतीतीर्थ).  He has been credited with establishing the Vijayanagara Empire in 1335, along with Harihara Raya and Bukka Raya. He was the minister of Bukka-devaraya of the Yadava Dynasty,  and Prime Minister of the Vijayanagara empire. Vidyaranya was also the spiritual head of Sringeri Math from 1377 to 1386. He died in 1391.

Vidyaranya also wrote Drk-Drsya-Viveka, Sarvadarsana Samgraha, Sri Sankara Digvijaya, Jivanmukti Viveka, Anubhuti Prakasa, Vivaranaprameyasamgraha and Upanishad Dipika has been identified with Sayanacharya, the commentator on the Vedas, whose brother he most likely was.

Theme 
The Panchadasi is a basic text which introduces into central doctrine of Advaita Vedantic philosophy. Deeper concepts are dealt in more advanced treatise- the Upanishads, the Brahmasutras and the Bhagavad Gita.

The purpose of the life is the realization of the experience of Absolute Existence, which is the highest fulfillment all the aspirations of the whole of creation.

Panchdasi as the name suggest this text, "consisting of 15 Chapters grouped into three quintads. This is very much like the three aspects of Brahman – sat (existence), cit (consciousness) and ananda (bliss), respectively.
 Viveka-panchaka  (विवेक-पञ्चक, viveka-paṃcaka) (dealing with the discrimination of the real from the non-real): Understanding the nature of reality (Viveka) which distinguishes from external world (जगत, jagata) consist of the five elements -Ether, Air, Fire, Water and Earth and individual (Jiva) consisting of the five sheaths – Annamaya (अन्नमय, annamaya, Physical), Pranamaya (प्राणमय , prāṇamaya, Vital), Manomaya ( मनोमय,  manomaya, Mental), Vijnanamaya (विज्ञानमय, vijñānamaya, Intellectual) and Anandamaya (आनन्दमय, ānandamaya, bliss). Pure spirit is encased with five sheaths to delude individual soul as self. Cosmology of creation is described similar to Samkhya (सांख्य,sāṃkhya) philosophy stating the relationship between pure consciousness (Brahman) with material universe.
 Dipa-panchaka (दीप-पञ्चक, dīpa-paṃcaka) (expounding the nature of the Self as pure consciousness) : The second set of five chapters through light (Dipa) on the Pure Consciousness (Brahman) as the only Reality with Existence (Sat). God (Isvara), World (Jagat) and Individual (Jiva) are described in detail with their mutual relationship. Theory of perception and process of the ascent of the Jiva to its supreme goal, liberation from Maya (illusion) to unite with Brahman the Absolute. Meaning and method of meditation the way to contact with Reality is also described in very lucid and candid discourse.
 Ananda-panchaka (आनन्द-पञ्चक, ānanda-paṃcaka) (dwelling on the bliss-nature of Brahman): The last five chapters go into details of Brahman as pure Bliss (Ananda). This is not worldly happiness but complex dissolution into eternal pleasure. Duality of Jiva and God merging into one Consciousness and Existence. This Atman ( Brahman) is the source of ultimate happiness the purpose of human life.
Vidyaranya has succeeded in an eminent way in setting forth the essentials of Advaita which holds that the direct means to release is the path of knowledge (jnana), and as moksa is the very nature of the Self, it is not an experience which is to be brought about through works (karma) ".

Content

Viveka-panchaka (विवेक-पञ्चक)  

Chapter 1 Tatvaviveka (तत्वविवेकप्रकरणम्) – The discriminative knowledge of the ultimate Reality (main article Tatvaviveka)

Chapter 2 Mahabhutaviveka (महाभूतविवेकप्रकरणम्) – The discriminative knowledge of the five elements

Chapter 3 Panchakosaviveka (पन्चकोशविवेकप्रकरणम्) – The discrimination of the five sheaths

Chapter 4 Dvaitaviveka (द्वैतविवेकप्रकरणम्) – Discrimination of Duality

Chapter 5 Mahavakyavivekaya (महावाक्यविवे)कयप्रकरणम्) – Understanding the import of the Mahavakyas

Dipa-panchaka (दीप-पञ्चक) 

Chapter 6 Chitradeepa (चित्रदीपप्रकरणम्) – The Picture on Pure Consciousness

Chapter 7 Triptidipa (तिृप्तिदीपप्रकरणम्) – Fulfillment on Realization of Pure Consciousness

Chapter 8 Kutasthadipa (कूटस्थदीपप्रकरणम्) – The Immutable Consciousness

Chapter 9 Dhyanadeepa (ध्यानदीपप्रकरणम्) – Meditation on pure Consciousness

Chapter 10 Natakadipa (नाटकदीपप्रकरणम्) – The lamp of the theatre

Ananda-panchaka (आनन्द-पञ्चक) 

Chapter 11 Yogananda (योगानन्दप्रकरणम्) - The Bliss Of Yoga

Chapter 12 Atmananda (आत्मानन्दप्रकरणम्) - The Bliss of the Self

Chapter 13 Advaitananda (अद्वैतानन्दप्रकरणम्) - The Bliss of Non-Duality

Chapter 14 Vidyananda (विद्यानन्दप्रकरणम्) - The Bliss of Knowledge

Chapter 15 Vishayananda (विषयानन्दप्रकरणम्) - The happiness from external objects

See also 
 Advaita Vedanta
 Bhagavad Gita
 Upanishad
पञ्चदशी

References

External links

Texts and Commentaries 

 Panchadashi Sanskrit at nic.in
 Commentary on the Panchadasi - Swami Krishnananda
 The Philosophy of Panchadasi by Swami Krishnananda
 Commentary on Panchadasi by Swami Paramarthananda
 Panchadashi translated with an Introduction by Hari Prasad Shastri

Sanskrit texts
Vedanta
Advaita Vedanta
Advaita Vedanta texts